The Zilis were a Canadian rock and roll group from Hamilton, Ontario, active from 2012 to 2017. Two of the members continue to write original music as The Bleeding Idahos.

Biography
The group began playing covers as The Led Hot Zili Peppers in 2009 to pay for the expenses of their former band, Dean Lickyer. When Dean Lickyer disbanded, Royle and Bozzo began singing and writing original music as The Zilis. Touring frequently, they released two critically acclaimed albums between 2012 and 2014.

The Zilis played festivals and concerts alongside notable acts, including July Talk, The Sheepdogs, Said The Whale, Monster Truck, Arkells, Hey Rosetta!, Protest the Hero, Ubiquitous Synergy Seeker, David Wilcox, Marianas Trench, Flogging Molly, Matt Mays & El Torpedo, KISS, Bon Jovi and Wheatus.

The group went on hiatus in 2017. Royle and Lamothe have since become music teachers and session musicians, and Bozzo is now an attorney. Royle and Bozzo formed a new band, The Bleeding Idahos.

Awards

Hamilton Music Awards – "Rock Recording of the Year" (for Sketches) nomination (2012)
The Deli Magazine – "Artist of the Month" (March 2015)
Hamilton Music Awards – "Bassist of the Year" (2015)
Hamilton Music Awards – "Alternative/Indie Rock Recording of the Year" (for Sketches II) nomination (2015)

Band members
Sean Royle – vocals, electric guitar, acoustic guitar, banjitar, organ, harmonica, melodica, percussion (2012–21)
Zander Lamothe – drums, percussion, vocals (2012–20)
Justin Bozzo – vocals, bass guitar, electric guitar, acoustic guitar, piano, organ, harmonica, kazoo, percussion (2012–21)

Discography

Sketches (2012)
Mattina Sunshine
Coyote Nowhere
The Plight of Mrs. Brezhnev (Pt. I)
The Meter
Only Love
Fool's Paradise
Ginny's Been Gone
Trumpets of the Tide

Sketches II (2014)
Trust in Me, Lorraine
Diamondback
Don't Ever Change
Not Around
Ballad of a Broken Heart
(All I Do Is) Treat You Right
On the West Side of Town
The Way Love Goes

See also
Folk Radio UK

References

External links
www.thezilis.com 
The Zilis on Facebook
The Zilis on Twitter
The Zilis on Bandcamp
"Watch Ontario’s The Zilis Bring Fireside Folk Onto The Stage...". 

Musical groups established in 2012
Musical groups disestablished in 2021
Musical groups from Hamilton, Ontario
Canadian rock music groups
2012 establishments in Ontario
2021 disestablishments in Ontario